The Usina tree frog (Boana lundii) is a species of frog in the family Hylidae endemic to Brazil. Its natural habitats are subtropical or tropical moist lowland forests, subtropical or tropical moist montane forests, moist savanna, rivers, and plantations .

References

Boana
Endemic fauna of Brazil
Amphibians described in 1856
Taxonomy articles created by Polbot